Martinsdale Colony is a Hutterite community and census-designated place (CDP) in Wheatland County, Montana, United States. The Musselshell River forms the southern edge of the CDP.

U.S. Route 12 runs through the southern part of the CDP, leading east  to Harlowton, the Wheatland county seat, and west  to White Sulphur Springs.

The community was first listed as a CDP prior to the 2020 census.

Demographics

Education
It is zoned to Harlowton Public Schools.

References 

Census-designated places in Wheatland County, Montana
Census-designated places in Montana
Hutterite communities in the United States